CrimeAnalyst is an extension for ArcGIS Desktop, a suite of geographic information system (GIS) software products. It provides added functionality for crime analysis and crime mapping. CrimeAnalyst is produced by ESRI (UK).

Features 

CrimeAnalyst functionality includes:
 Crime hotspot / density maps
 Temporal crime analysis / aoristic data clocks
 Spatial distribution and analysis
 Identifications of repeat victims of crime
 Identifying connections between related locations in a crime
 Calculating spatial statistics

Development

See also 
ArcGIS Desktop
ProductivitySuite

References 

 Sunday Times Online Police Deploy Software to Beat Criminals to Scene of Crime Published 29 March 2009

External links 
 
  - ESRI

ArcGIS Extension
Crime mapping